Swimming at the 1963 South Pacific Games took place in Suva, the capital of Fiji. It was the first edition of the South Pacific Games and the race distances were in yards. There were fourteen events in total, eight for men and six for women. Three territories shared the medals; hosts Fiji won the largest number, with Papua New Guinea and New Caledonia in second and third place respectively.

Medal summary

Medal table

Men's events

Women's events

References

1963 Pacific Games
Pacific Games
Swimming at the Pacific Games